John Bell Farm is a historic home and farm complex located in West Whiteland Township, Chester County, Pennsylvania. It was originally built in the 1840s and extensively remodeled in 1889 in the Queen Anne style.  The original house consists of the two-story, five bay, stone central block with two-story service wing.  When remodeled, the roof received a cross-gable and dormer windows.  Also added was the two-story library wing, kitchen extension, and two-sided porch.  Also on the property are a contributing spring house, tenant house, corn crib, and barn.

It was listed on the National Register of Historic Places in 1984.

References

Farms on the National Register of Historic Places in Pennsylvania
Queen Anne architecture in Pennsylvania
Houses completed in 1889
Houses in Chester County, Pennsylvania
National Register of Historic Places in Chester County, Pennsylvania